Cory Lake Isles is a neighborhood within the city limits of Tampa, Florida. As of the 2010 census the neighborhood had a population of 2261. The ZIP Codes serving the area are 33592 and 33647.

Geography
The neighborhood is part of the New Tampa district.

Demographics
Source: Hillsborough County Atlas

At the 2010 census there were 2261 people and 709 households residing in the neighborhood. The population density was 184/mi2. The racial makeup of the neighborhood was 58% White, 13% African American, 0% Native American, 23% Asian, 2% from other races, and 4% were from two or more races. Hispanic or Latino of any race were about 12%.

Of the 709 households 31% had children under the age of 18 living with them, 75% were married couples living together, 5% had a female householder with no husband present, and 5% were non-families.

The age distribution was 31% under the age of 18, 17% from 18 to 34, 27% from 35 to 49, 18% from 50 to 64, and 7% 65 or older. For every 100 females, there were 98 males.

The per capita income for the neighborhood was $32,909. About 5% of the population were below the poverty line

See also
Neighborhoods in Tampa, Florida

References

External links
Cory Lake Isles Property Owners Association
Hillsborough County 2010 Census Information

Neighborhoods in Tampa, Florida